Hugo Fischer-Köppe (13 February 1890, in Bielefeld – 31 December 1937, in Berlin) was an early German film actor.

Fischer-Köppe entered film in 1917 and appeared in some 80 different films between 1913 and his premature death in 1937 in films such as Achtung! Auto-Diebe! in 1930 in which he worked with actor and director Harry Piel and Charly Berger.

Selected filmography
 The Men of Frau Clarissa (1922)
 The Queen of Whitechapel (1922) 
 The Shadows of That Night (1922)
 The Big Shot (1922)
 The Morals of the Alley (1925)
 Three Waiting Maids (1925)
 Oh Those Glorious Old Student Days (1925)
 War in Peace (1925)
 Ash Wednesday (1925)
 The Trumpets are Blowing (1926)
 The Captain from Koepenick (1926)
 The Last Horse Carriage in Berlin (1926)
 Countess Ironing-Maid (1926)
 The Armoured Vault (1926)
 The Man Without Sleep (1926)
 Maytime (1926)
 I Stand in the Dark Midnight (1927)
 Night of Mystery (1927)
 The Criminal of the Century (1928)
 Queen of Fashion (1929)
 Three Days Confined to Barracks (1930)
 Love in the Ring (1930)
 The Copper (1930)
 Gloria (1931)
 Grock (1931)
 Alarm at Midnight (1931)
 Wibbel the Tailor (1931)
 Who Takes Love Seriously? (1931)
 Duty Is Duty (1931)
 My Cousin from Warsaw (1931)
 Terror of the Garrison (1931)
 Checkmate (1931)
Peace of Mind (1931)
 No Money Needed (1932)
 Spell of the Looking Glass (1932)
 The Blue of Heaven (1932)
 Madame Makes Her Exit (1932)
 The Dancer of Sanssouci (1932)
 Paprika (1932)
 Haunted People (1932)
 Two Good Comrades (1933)
 Bon Voyage (1933)
 Dream of the Rhine (1933)
 The Big Bluff (1933)
 Decoy (1934)
 Police Report (1934)
 The Daring Swimmer (1934)
 Alarm in Peking (1937)

References

External links
 
 Portrait of the actor Hugo Fischer-Köppe

1890 births
1937 deaths
German male film actors
German male silent film actors
20th-century German male actors